The Sortes Homericae (Latin for "Homeric lots"), a type of divination by bibliomancy, involved drawing a random sentence or line from the works of Homer (usually the Iliad) to answer a question or to predict the future. In the Roman world it co-existed with the various forms of the  sortes, such as the Sortes Virgilianae and their Christian successor the Sortes Sanctorum.

Socrates reportedly used this practice to determine the day of his execution.  Brutus also is reported to have used this practice, which informed him Pompey would lose the battle of Pharsalus (48 BCE). The emperor Marcus Opellius Macrinus is also known to have used sortes Homericae, learning that he would not last long on the imperial throne. However, unlike the Sortes Virgilianae, sortes Homericae did not have an established status as a concept and practice. There are only three known uses of this, separated by centuries and of doubtful authenticity, and of those, two don't involve opening the Iliad at random and randomly choosing a passage, as is established in bibliomancy, and in Sortes Virgilianae specifically. Rather, they involve the person dreaming or thinking about the passage, as occurred with Socrates and Brutus respectively.

References

Sources
Gargantua and Pantagruel, Book 3, from "The Complete Works of Francois Rabelais", p285

Bibliomancy
Homer